Lineostriastiria hachita is a moth in the family Noctuidae (the owlet moths). It was described by William Barnes in 1904 and is found in North America.

The MONA or Hodges number for Lineostriastiria hachita is 9758.

References

 Crabo L, Davis M, Hammond P, Mustelin T, Shepard J (2013). "Five new species and three new subspecies of Erebidae and Noctuidae (Insecta, Lepidoptera) from Northwestern North America, with notes on Chytolita Grote (Erebidae) and Hydraecia Guenée (Noctuidae)". ZooKeys 264: 85-123.
 Lafontaine, J. Donald & Schmidt, B. Christian (2010). "Annotated check list of the Noctuoidea (Insecta, Lepidoptera) of North America north of Mexico". ZooKeys, vol. 40, 1–239.

Further reading

 Arnett, Ross H. (2000). American Insects: A Handbook of the Insects of America North of Mexico. CRC Press.

External links

 Butterflies and Moths of North America
 NCBI Taxonomy Browser, Lineostriastiria hachita

Amphipyrinae